Below is a list of notable private-equity firms.

Largest private-equity firms by PE capital raised
Each year Private Equity International publishes the PEI 300, a ranking of the largest private-equity firms by how much capital they have raised for private-equity investment in the last five years:

List of investment banking private-equity groups

^ Defunct banking institution

Notable private-equity firms

Americas

  3G Capital
  ABS Capital
  Accel-KKR
  Advent International
  AEA Investors
  American Securities
  Angelo, Gordon & Co.
  Apollo Management
  Ares Management
  Arlington Capital Partners
  Auldbrass Partners
  Avenue Capital Group
  Avista Capital Partners
  Bain Capital
  BDT Capital Partners
  Berkshire Partners
  Blackstone Group
  Blum Capital
  Brentwood Associates
  Brockway Moran & Partners
  Brookfield
  Bruckmann, Rosser, Sherrill & Co.
  Brynwood Partners
  Brysam Global Partners
  Caisse de dépôt et placement du Québec
  CapitalG
  Carlyle Group
  Castle Harlan
  CCMP Capital
  Centerbridge Partners
  Cerberus Capital Management
  Charlesbank Capital Partners
  Charterhouse Group
  Chicago Growth Partners
  CI Capital Partners
  CIVC Partners
  Clarity Partners
  Clayton, Dubilier & Rice
  Clearlake Capital
  Colony Capital
  Court Square Capital Partners
  CPP Investment Board
  CrossHarbor Capital Partners
  Crossroads Group
  Cypress Group
  Defoe Fournier & Cie.
  Diamond Castle Holdings
  DLJ Merchant Banking Partners
  DRI Capital
  Elevation Partners
  EnCap Investments
  Fenway Partners
  First Reserve Corporation
  Forstmann Little & Company
  Fortress Investment Group
  Founders Circle Capital
  Fox Paine & Company
  Francisco Partners
  Freeman Spogli & Co.
  Fremont Group
  Friedman Fleischer & Lowe
  Frontenac Company
  General Atlantic
  Genstar Capital
  GI Partners
  Golden Gate Capital Partners
  Goldman Sachs Capital Partners
  Gores Group
  GP Investimentos
  GTCR
  H.I.G. Capital
  Harbert Management Corporation
  HarbourVest Partners
  Harvest Partners
  Heartland Industrial Partners
  Hellman & Friedman
  Highbridge Capital Management
  Highland Capital Management
  HM Capital Partners
  InterMedia Partners
  Irving Place Capital
  J.H. Whitney & Company
  J.W. Childs Associates
  JC Flowers
  JLL Partners
  Jordan Company
  Kelso & Company
  Khosla Ventures
  Kinderhook Industries
  Kleiner Perkins
  Kohlberg & Company
  KPS Capital Partners
  KRG Capital
  KSL Capital Partners
  L Catterton
  Lake Capital
  Landmark Partners
  Lee Equity Partners
  Leeds Equity Partners
  Leonard Green & Partners
  Lexington Partners
  Lightyear Capital
  Lincolnshire Management
  Lindsay Goldberg Bessemer
  Littlejohn & Co.
  Lone Star Funds
  Lovell Minnick Partners
  LRG Capital Funds
  Lux Capital
  Madison Dearborn Partners
  MatlinPatterson Global Advisors
  Metalmark Capital
  MidOcean Partners
  Morgan Stanley Private Equity
  Morgenthaler
  Newbridge Capital
  NRDC Equity Partners
  Oak Hill Capital Partners
  Oak Investment Partners
  Oaktree Capital Management
  Olympus Partners
  OMERS
  One Equity Partners
  Onex Corporation
  Ontario Teachers' Pension Plan
  OrbiMed
  PAAMCO
  Pamlico Capital
  Platinum Equity
  Pretium Partners
  Prolifico Group
  Providence Equity Partners
  Quadrangle Group
  Redpoint Ventures
  Rhône Group
  Riordan, Lewis & Haden
  Ripplewood Holdings
  Riverside Partners
  Riverstone Holdings
  Roark Capital Group
  RPX Corporation
  Sentinel Capital Partners
  Silver Lake Partners
  Starwood Capital Group
  Summit Partners
  Sun Capital Partners
  Sycamore Partners
  Symphony Technology Group
  TA Associates
  Tavistock Group
  TCV
  TCW/Crescent Mezzanine
  Thayer Hidden Creek
  Thoma Bravo
  Thoma Cressey Bravo
  Thomas H. Lee Partners
  Tiger Global Management
  TowerBrook Capital Partners
  TPG Capital
  Trilantic Capital Partners
  Trivest
  TSG Consumer Partners
  Veronis Suhler Stevenson
  Vestar Capital Partners
  Vista Equity Partners
  Vulcan Capital Management
  Warburg Pincus
  Warwick Energy Group
  Wellspring Capital Management
  Welsh, Carson, Anderson & Stowe
  Wesray Capital Corporation
  Weston Presidio
  Willis Stein & Partners
  Wind Point Partners
  WL Ross & Co.
  Yucaipa Cos.
  Zelnick Media Capital

Asia

  Affinity Equity Partners
  Archer Capital
  Axiom Asia
  Baring Private Equity Asia
  BGH Capital
  China Media Capital
  Cowin Capital
  DST Global
  Dymon Asia Private Equity
  Ekuinas
  H&Q Asia Pacific
  Hillhouse Capital Group
  Hony Capital
  JAFCO
  Leopard Capital LP
  Mekong Capital
  MBK Partners
  Northstar Group
  Pacific Equity Partners
  PAG
  Quadria Capital
  Quadrant Private Equity
  RRJ Capital
  Seavi Advent
  Welkin Capital Management
  Yunfeng Capital
  Zhongzhi Capital

EMEA

  3i
  Actis
  AlpInvest Partners
  Altor Equity Partners
  Apax Partners
  Arcapita
  Ardian
  Argentum Fondsinvesteringer
  Axcel
  Aurelius Group 
  Baring Vostok Capital Partners
  BC Partners
  BIP Investment Partners
  Bridgepoint Capital
  Butler Capital Partners
  CapMan
  Capital Dynamics
  Capvis
  Charterhouse Capital Partners
  Cinven
  Close Brothers Group
  Coller Capital
  Conquest Asset Management
  C.W. Obel
  CVC Capital Partners
  Doughty Hanson & Co
  Dubai International Capital
  Duke Street Capital
  EMVest Asset Management
  EQT Partners
  Eurazeo
  Ferd
  Fondinvest Capital
  GFH Capital
  GIMV
  Graphite Capital
  GK Investment
  HgCapital
  ICT Group
  Idinvest Partners
  IFD Kapital Group
  IK Investment Partners
  Investindustrial
  Intermediate Capital Group
  Investcorp
  Jadwa Investment
  Kennet Partners
  Kistefos
  LGT Capital Partners
  Livingbridge
  M. Goldschmidt Holding
  Marfin Investment Group
  MerchantBridge
  Meyer Bergman
  Mid Europa Partners
  Mutares
  Nordic Capital
  Norfund
  OpCapita
  PAI Partners
  Pantheon Ventures
  Partners Group
  Permira
  Phoenix Equity Partners
  Ratos
  Riovic Capital Group
  Silverfleet Capital Partners
  SL Capital Partners
  SVG Capital
  Terra Firma Capital Partners
  Unbound Group
  Vitruvian Partners

See also
 Private equity
 Private-equity firm
 Private-equity fund
 History of private equity and venture capital
 Sovereign wealth fund
 List of exchange-traded funds

Related lists
 Private-equity firm articles 
 Venture capital firm articles 
 Private-equity fund of funds
 List of venture capital firms
 List of real estate investment firms
 Sovereign wealth fund

Other lists
 List of hedge funds
 List of investment banks
 List of asset management firms
 Boutique investment bank

References

Lists of companies by industry

Lists of financial services companies